The Northwest Branch Trail is a  multi-use (hiking, biking, equestrian) trail that follows the Northwest Branch of the Anacostia River in the Maryland suburbs of Washington DC. It is part of the Rachel Carson Greenway and the Anacostia Tributary Trail System. It runs between the Layhill neighborhood of Silver Spring and Bladensburg in Montgomery and Prince George's County, Maryland, USA.

Background
The trail starts in Bladensburg, Prince George's County, Maryland, and runs north following the Northwest Branch of the Anacostia River, ending in the Layhill neighborhood of Montgomery County, Maryland. It connects with a number of other trails including the Sligo Creek Trail in Carole Highlands.

The lower third of the trail, which is paved, runs  from Bladensburg to the Prince George's-Montgomery county line in Adelphi near New Hampshire Avenue and Piney Branch Road, then continues approximately 1.26 miles into Montgomery County. The paved trail then terminates around trail mile 7.26, at the southern terminus of the Rachel Carson Greenway and the Capital Beltway. Once the trail crosses the county line it runs to the Burnt Mills Dam. The dam is the site of the former Camp Woodrow Wilson, the two Georgian Revival pump houses of the Robert B. Morse Filtration Plant, and is now the Burnt Mills Dam parks (East and West).

From the dam the trail proceeds north to Wheaton Regional Park. Between the Burnt Mills Dam trailhead on Colesville Road and Kemp Mill Road near Wheaton Regional Park the trail runs along the west side of the Northwest Branch creek. This is a natural multi-use surface trail. On the east side of the creek is the Rachel Carson Greenway trail, a hiker-only trai.

The rocky area known as the "Torrent and Gorge", section is the geological fall line between the Piedmont and Atlantic coastal plain regions, which forms a small waterfall.

The Northwest Branch Trail Corridor was officially renamed as the Rachel Carson Greenway in 2004.

References

External links
 
 

Protected areas of Montgomery County, Maryland
Protected areas of Prince George's County, Maryland
Hiking trails in Maryland